Joseph "Joe" Sherman is an American educator and musician living in the Bronx.

Education 
Sherman graduated from Stuyvesant High School in 1962. He studied music at Ithaca College before earning a degree from Cornell University, where he studied saxophone performance.

Career 
Sherman taught mathematics in the public schools of New York City before being named the founding principal of the High School for Violin and Dance, the first New York public high school to utilize an experimental, alternative mode of public education.  

Although possessing a background as a jazz tenor saxophone player and bandleader, Sherman studied the violin, became a private violin teacher, and joined the Bronx Symphony Orchestra in 1981 as a violinist, later being named its conductor and managing director.

References

Year of birth missing (living people)
Living people
American jazz tenor saxophonists
American bandleaders
American classical violinists
American conductors (music)
Musicians from the Bronx
Musicians from New York City
Educators from New York City
Jazz musicians from New York (state)
Cornell University alumni
Stuyvesant High School alumni